Neoboletus venenatus, known until 2015 as Boletus venenatus, is a species of bolete fungus in the family Boletaceae native to Japan and China. It was transferred to the new genus Neoboletus by Chinese mycologists Gang Wu and Zhu L. Yang in 2015.

Taxonomy
Japanese mycologist Eiji Nagasawa described this species as Boletus venenatus in 1995. It is known in Japan as dokuyamadori or tahei-iguchi.

Description
The surface is dry and slightly furry when young, and the cap margin curved inwards. The pores are yellow to yellow-brown and stain dark blue quickly upon bruising. It also stains pale blue on bruising. The mycelium is pale yellow.

Distribution and habitat
Neoboletus venenatus has been found in southwestern China, specifically Laojun Mountain in Yulong County in Yunnan province and Kangding County in Sichuan province, and Japan, specifically Hokkaido and central Honshu. It grows in subalpine regions. associated with conifers such as Abies, Picea and Tsuga.

Toxicity
Neoboletus venenatus is poisonous, causing severe gastrointestinal symptoms of nausea and recurrent vomiting, which can be severe enough to result in dehydration. Symptoms generally resolve in a few days. One toxic compound—bolevenine—was isolated and described by Matsuura and colleagues in 2007.

References

External links

venenatus
Fungi described in 1996
Fungi of China
Fungi of Japan
Poisonous fungi